The COSEDA Technologies GmbH is a software development company located in Dresden, Germany that was founded in 2015 as a spin-off from the Fraunhofer Institute  or Integrated Circuits IIS, Division Engineering of Adaptive Systems EAS, one of the largest research institutions in the field of design automation in Europe. The Company's design environment COSIDE, is the first commercially available design environment based on SystemC as well as on SystemC AMS standards. The company also provides the only publicly available proof of concept to the SystemC AMS-Standard IEEE 1666.1-2016.

See also 
 SystemC AMS
 SystemC

References

External links
Official site

Electronic design automation companies